Hassan Khan Bayat was the second khan of the Maku Khanate from 1778 to 1822. He and his brother were the khan jointly.

References

People from Maku, Iran
Maku Khanate
18th-century monarchs of Persia
19th-century monarchs of Persia
Year of birth unknown
Year of death unknown